Greentouch Entertainment Pvt. Ltd. is an Indian media and entertainment company based in Kolkata, West Bengal. Started in 2012, Greentouch Entertainment is one of the prominent Bengali movie production houses in West Bengal.

Film Production
Greentouch Entertainment Pvt. Ltd.  has produced and distributed Bengali feature films, such as Jodi Love Dilena Prane, Asche Bochor Abar Hobe, Hercules, Lorai, Katmundu, Bastushaap, Hemanta, Chocolate and Dekh Kemon Lage
The upcoming releases are Honeymoon and Michael.
Now the Company is renamed as Shadow Films

Television
In addition to the film production activities, Greentouch Entertainment has also produced Bengali serials. The prime-time show "Hiyar Majhe", a joint production with Magic Moments Motion Pictures starring Monami Ghosh and Badshah Moitra was telecasted on ETV Bangla in 2013 .

The company has also been produced the story of Taranath Tantrik in 2016 telecasted on Colors Bangla.

Filmography

References

External links 

 

Entertainment companies of India
Companies based in Kolkata
Entertainment companies established in 2012
2012 establishments in West Bengal
Indian companies established in 2012